Woori Financial Group is a Seoul-based banking and financial services holdings company and is the largest bank in South Korea.
Woori has had a short history as a financial institution. It was formed in 2001 from the forced merger of 4 predecessor commercial banks and an investment bank (Hanvit, Peace, Kwangju and Kyongnam Banks and Hanaro Investment Banking and their subsidiaries). The banks were taken over and recapitalised by the government because they had fallen below the Basel I Accord mandated eight percent capital adequacy ratio. The South Korean Government, through the Korean Deposit Insurance Corporation, remains the primary investor as a result.

This came about as a part of the 1997 Asian financial crisis, which affected the operations of virtually all banks and financial firms in South Korea.

Business
Woori Bank

See also

List of South Korean companies
Woori Bank

External links
 

Companies listed on the New York Stock Exchange
Financial services companies of South Korea
Banks established in 2001
Banks disestablished in 2014
Companies listed on the Korea Exchange
South Korean companies established in 2001
2014 disestablishments in South Korea